Pleurobranchus is a genus of sea slugs, specifically side-gill slugs, marine gastropod mollusc in the family Pleurobranchidae. 

They typically occur in intertidal and shallow subtidal waters of tropical and subtropical seas worldwide.

Species
As of November 2021, the World Register of Marine Species (WoRMS) recognizes following species as valid:
 Pleurobranchus albiguttatus (Bergh, 1905)
 Pleurobranchus areolatus Mörch, 1863 – Atlantic sidegill slug
 Pleurobranchus crossei Vayssière, 1897
 Pleurobranchus digueti Rochebrune, 1895
 Pleurobranchus evelinae T. E. Thompson, 1977
 Pleurobranchus forskalii Rüppell & Leuckart, 1828
 Pleurobranchus grandis Pease, 1868
 Pleurobranchus hilli (Hedley, 1894)
 Pleurobranchus iouspi Ev. Marcus, 1984
 Pleurobranchus lacteus Dall & Simpson, 1901
 Pleurobranchus mamillatus Quoy & Gaimard, 1832
 Pleurobranchus membranaceus (Montagu, 1816)
 Pleurobranchus nigropunctatus (Bergh, 1907)
 Pleurobranchus niveus (A. E. Verrill, 1901)
 Pleurobranchus obeses K. M. White, 1946
 Pleurobranchus peronii Cuvier, 1804
 Pleurobranchus reticulatus Rang, 1832
 Pleurobranchus semperi (Vayssière, 1896)
 Pleurobranchus sishaensis (Zhang & Lin, 1965)
 Pleurobranchus testudinarius Cantraine, 1835
 Pleurobranchus varians Pease, 1860
 Pleurobranchus weberi (Bergh, 1905)

Goodheart et al. (2015) recognized 14 valid species, while Alvim & Pimenta (2016) recognized one other species.

References

 Bergh, L. S. R. 1897-1902. System der Nudibranchiaten Gasteropoden. Malacologische Untersuchungen. In: Reisen im Archipel der Philippinen von Dr. Carl Gottfried Semper. Zweiter Theil. Wissenschaftliche Resultate. Band 7, Theil 5.

Further reading
 
 Howson, C.M.; Picton, B.E. (Ed.) (1997). The species directory of the marine fauna and flora of the British Isles and surrounding seas. Ulster Museum Publication, 276. The Ulster Museum: Belfast, UK. . vi, 508 (+ cd-rom) pp.

 
Gastropod genera
Taxa named by Georges Cuvier